The Mines Museum of Earth Science, formerly the Colorado School of Mines Geology Museum, is a geology museum based in the Colorado School of Mines, Golden, Colorado, United States. It was established in 1873 and opened in 1874.

The museum has two floors in which it displays fossils, gemstones, meteorites, minerals, and mining artifacts, including the Colorado lunar sample displays. The museum acts as the Colorado state repository for mineral heritage.

Gallery

See also 
 Lariat Loop Scenic & Historic Byway
 Colorado lunar sample displays
 List of museums in Colorado

References

External links 

 Museum website
A hidden gem in Golden, Denver Post, 02/18/2016

Museums established in 1873
Mining museums in Colorado
Geology Museum
Geology museums in the United States
University museums in Colorado
Museums in Golden, Colorado
Natural history museums in Colorado
Paleontology in Colorado